Heike Esser (born 4 July 1973) is a German swimmer. She competed in the women's 200 metre breaststroke at the 1988 Summer Olympics representing West Germany.

References

External links
 

1973 births
Living people
German female swimmers
Olympic swimmers of West Germany
Swimmers at the 1988 Summer Olympics
People from Rhein-Erft-Kreis
Sportspeople from Cologne (region)
German female breaststroke swimmers